European route E 262 is a road part of the International E-road network. It begins in Kaunas, Lithuania and ends in Ostrov, Pskov Oblast, Russia. The section in Lithuania from Kaunas to the Latvia border, near Zarasai is named after A6 highway. 

The road follows: Kaunas - Ukmergė - Daugavpils - Rēzekne - Ostrov.

Gallery

References

External links 
 UN Economic Commission for Europe: Overall Map of E-road Network (2007)

262
Roads in Lithuania
Roads in Latvia
E262